Shaalin Zoya also known as Shalu is an Indian actress, dancer and anchor. She is best known for playing the negative role of Deepa Rani in Asianet TV's soap opera Autograph and a supporting role of Jessy in Elsamma Enna Aankutty.

Early life 

Shaalin Zoya hails from Tirur-Malappuram, Kerala. Her father is a businessman. Her mother, a dance teacher, encouraged her to pick up a career in acting.

Filmography

As actor

Television career

Awards
2011 - Asianet Ayucare Television Award - Best New Face of the year (for TV soap opera Autograph)
2011 - Kazhcha Television Award - Best Performer - Female (for TV serial Autograph)
 Vayalar Award for Best Child Artist (for film Elsamma Enna Aankutty)

References

External links 
  

Indian film actresses
Actresses in Malayalam cinema
Living people
Actresses from Kozhikode
1997 births
20th-century Indian actresses
Indian television actresses
Actresses in Malayalam television
Actresses in Hindi television
Actresses in Tamil cinema
Child actresses in Malayalam cinema